Martin Vetkal is an Estonian professional footballer who plays as a midfielder for Italian club Roma Primavera.

Club career 
Vetkal made his debut with Tallinna Kalev in Estonian top tier on 21 June 2019 against FC Flora, allegedly needing a special authorisation from the federation to play being only aged 15.

He became the youngest scorer ever of the Estonian Premium Liiga, scoring his first goal at 15 years and 261 days against Viljandi JK Tulevik on 9 November 2019. He was considered as one of the top prospects of his generation in Europe at his very early age.

Following his debut season in Estonia, he visited several Italian club such as Genova, SPAL or Sassuolo. In March 2020 he did a test for Schalke 04, along with his teammate Tristan Toomas Teeväli.

He signed for A.S. Roma in August 2020.

International career 
Vetkal is a youth international with Estonia, and was set to play in the 2020 Euro U17 to be held in his country, that was put on hold because of the COVID-19 pandemic. Preparing this competition the Estonians played against several other countries in friendlies or minor tournament, gaining wins against big European team such as France, Sweden or Spain.

References

External links

2004 births
Living people
Footballers from Tallinn
Association football defenders
Estonian footballers
Estonia youth international footballers
JK Tallinna Kalev players